
Year 573 (DLXXIII) was a common year starting on Sunday (link will display the full calendar) of the Julian calendar. The denomination 573 for this year has been used since the early medieval period, when the Anno Domini calendar era became the prevalent method in Europe for naming years.

Events 
 By place 

 Byzantine Empire 

 Byzantine–Sassanid War: Persian forces under the command of King Khosrau I capture the Byzantine stronghold of Dara, after a six-month siege. Meanwhile, a smaller Persian army under Adarmahan advances from Babylon through the desert, crosses the Euphrates River and ravages Syria. The cities of Apamea and Antiochia are plundered.

 Europe 
 King Sigibert I goes to war against his half brother Chilperic I of Neustria at the urging of his wife, Brunhilda. He appeals to the Germans on the right bank of the Rhine for help, and they obligingly attack the environs of Paris and Chartres.   
 The Lombards again raid Southern Gaul, but are defeated by the Franks under Mummolus, patricius and son of the Gallo-Roman count of Auxerre, and are driven out.
 King Cleph completes the Lombard conquest of Tuscany (Central Italy) and extends his dominion to the gates of Ravenna.   
 Sigibert I appoints Gregory to succeed his mother's cousin, Eufronius, as bishop of Tours (approximate date).

 Britain 
 The Battle of Arfderydd is fought between Gwenddoleu ap Ceidio and the sons of Eliffer, Gwrgi and Peredur. The forces of Gwenddoleu are killed, and Myrddin Wyllt goes mad watching this defeat (according to the Annales Cambriae).

 By topic 
 Religion 
 Pope John III is forced by the Lombards to retire from Rome, and takes up residence at the Catacombs along the Via Appia (approximate date).

Births 
 Abu Bakr, Muslim Caliph (approximate date)
 Chen Yin, crown prince of the Chen Dynasty
 Dou Jiande, general of the Sui Dynasty (d. 621)
 Jing Di, emperor of Northern Zhou (d. 581)
 Lupus of Sens, French bishop (approximate date)

Deaths 
 June 11 – Emilian of Cogolla, Iberic saint (b. 472)
 Brendan of Birr, Irish abbot (approximate date)
 Gwenddoleu ap Ceidio, Brythonic king 
 Narses, Byzantine general (b. 478)
 Wang Lin, Chinese general (b. 526)

References 

Bibliography